Peter Erler (born 10 April 1961 in Weißenfels) is a German historian.   The focus of his professional research is on the history of German emigrants in the Soviet Union, Soviet internment camps in Germany, together with political developments more generally in the Soviet occupation zone (1945–1949) and the German Democratic Republic (1949–1990).

Between 1980 and 1985 Peter Erler studied history and pedagogy at the Kuban State University, Krasnodar in the Soviet Union. He is also a member of the editorial staff of the newspaper of the Forschungsverbund.

References

20th-century German historians
1961 births
Living people
21st-century German historians